Estadio Alcaldesa Ester Roa Rebolledo is a multi-purpose stadium in Concepción, Chile.  It is used mostly for football matches. The stadium was built in 1962, as Estadio Regional, with an original capacity of 35,000 people. In 2015, it was completely renovated with new seats and a roof; currently has a capacity of 30,448 seats.

Until 2010 it was known as Estadio Municipal de Concepción. The stadium took its new name, Ester Roa Rebolledo, who was a former Concepción city mayor.

The stadium was being renovated by Spanish company COPASA, but in May 2014, after continuing delays, the contract was terminated. In September 2014 the municipality of Concepción hired Chilean company Claro Vicuña Valenzuela to finish the works. The stadium was not completed in time to host two 2015 Copa América group stage matches, which were moved to Santiago's Estadio Monumental David Arellano. It was finally reopened on 25 June 2015, in time to host three Copa América matches.

The Ester Roa is currently the home stadium for Universidad de Concepción, Fernández Vial and  Deportes Concepcion; Huachipato and Lota Schwager has also played some important home games at the stadium.

The highest ever recorded attendance was 43,340 on November 12, 1967 at the Primera Division match between Huachipato and Colo-Colo.

The stadium was also featured as a Copa América venue when the 1991 tournament was held in Chile.

In October 1987, the stadium was one of the venues for the FIFA U-20 World Cup.

In January 2004, it co-hosted the South American Pre-Olympic Tournament. 

In October & November 2015, the stadium was one of the venues for the FIFA U-17 World Cup.

The stadium is also occasionally used for music concerts and athletics tournaments.

1991 Copa América

2015 Copa América

References

Ester Roa
Ester Roa
Copa América stadiums
Multi-purpose stadiums in Chile
Sports venues completed in 1962
Buildings and structures in Concepción